The Paris Institute of Political Studies (also known as Sciences Po  or Sciences Po Paris) is a public research university, with the status of grande école and grand établissement, located in Paris, France, with further campuses in Dijon, Le Havre, Menton, Nancy, Poitiers and Reims. Sciences Po offers courses and conducts research in political science, history, economics, law and sociology.

The institute was established in 1872 by Émile Boutmy as the École libre des sciences politiques, a private and independent institution of higher education, founded in the aftermath of the Franco-Prussian War with the stated objective of renewing the training of the political elites and thereby contributing to ameliorating the nation's fortunes after its defeat of 1870. Boutmy aimed at modernising education for French civil servants, by offering additional teachings in political sciences, a relatively new field of study at the time. Students would follow traditional courses as a primary education, usually the classics or the law at the Sorbonne. 

In 1945, the school was nationalised and re-established as a public institution, after criticism of the attitude of its staff during the Second World War and subsequent calls for its closure.

After a reform in 1985, Sciences Po began offering full degrees in the social sciences as primary education for its students.  Since the mid-1990s, Sciences Po’'s curriculum has been substantially reformed beyond in social sciences beyond political sciences. As of 2021, 80% of Sciences Po graduates choose careers in the private sector.

The institute is a member of the Association of Professional Schools of International Affairs (APSIA) and CIVICA – The European University of Social Sciences.

History

1872 to 1945: Free School of Political Sciences 

Sciences Po was established in February 1872 as the École Libre des Sciences Politiques (ELSP) by a group of French intellectuals, politicians and businessmen led by Émile Boutmy, and including Hippolyte Taine, Ernest Renan, Albert Sorel and Paul Leroy Beaulieu. The creation of the school was in response to widespread fears that the inadequacy of the French political and diplomatic corps would further diminish the country's international stature, as France grappled with a series of crises, including the defeat in the 1870 Franco-Prussian War, the demise of Napoleon III, and the upheaval and massacre resulting from Paris Commune. The founders of the school sought to reform the training of French politicians by establishing a new "breeding ground where nearly all the major, non-technical state commissioners were trained.". His innovative intellectual axis was to teach contemporary history whereas political elites had been taught ancient humanities only for centuries, which they could still learn in universities at the same time.

ELSP acquired a major role in France's political system. From 1901 to 1935, 92.5% of entrants to the Grands corps de l'État, the most powerful and prestigious administrative bodies in the French Civil Service, had studied there (this figure includes people who took civil service examination preparatory classes at Sciences Po but did not earn a degree and, in general, students were taking class there on top of earning a degree in the University of Paris, in particular the Law Faculty).

Other countries created similar schools in the following century.

The connection between Sciences Po and French institutions meant that the school also played a key role in the apparatus of the French Empires. In 1886, the university established a colonial school with the goal of training students to take on professions in the colonial administration in a way that “propagates [...] a more scientific and international colonialism”. Many professors and members of the ELSP administration, such as Paul Leroy-Beaulieu, chair in colonial affairs at ELSP, Joseph Chailley-Bert, Jules Cambon, Charles Jonnart, Auguste Louis Albéric d’Arenberg and Ernest Roume, were also closely linked to or worked directly with the colonial government. The colonial branch of ELSP closed in 1893 after a state-sponsored colonial school was created in 1889; however positions in the administrations of French colonies and protectorates continued to accept graduates from the ELSP.

1945 to the 1990s: Institute of Political Sciences of Paris

1945: Re-foundation 
Sciences Po underwent significant reforms in the aftermath World War II in 1945. At France's liberation from Nazi occupation, the public servants were accused of collaborating with the Vichy regime and Nazi Germany. Sciences Po was then directly concerned by the draining goal of the National Council of the Resistance. Communist politicians including Georges Cogniot accused the school to be the "home of collaboration" with Nazi Germany and proposed abolishing the ELSP entirely and founding a new state-run administration college on its premises. To fight against this, Roger Seydoux, Jacques Chapsal and André Siegfried, from the school, excluded the most compromised (with Vichy and Nazi Germany) members of the school's staff, defended the school against accusation of collaboration and built up a communication campaign to save the school.

The choice would be made by France's Provisional Government, under Charles de Gaulle. Eight of its thirteen ministers were alumni from the school. They made the future of the school escape from the Parliament's control to end up in their own hands. Michel Debré, alumnus, Jules Jeanneney, alumnus whose son just came out of the school, and Roger Grégoire, alumnus, decided that the school would be preserved but under a new structure. Two separate legal entities were created: the Institut d'études politiques (IEP) and the Fondation Nationale des Sciences Politiques or FNSP. Both entities were tasked by the French government to ensure "the progress and the spread, both within and outside France, of political science, economics, and sociology". FNSP, a private foundation that receives generous subsidies from the government, manages the IEP de Paris, owns its buildings and libraries, and determines its budget. The two entities work together in lockstep, however, as the director of the school is, by tradition, also the administrator of FNSP. This institutional arrangement gives Sciences Po a unique status, as the school draws most of its resources through substantial government subsidies to FNSP, but does not subject it to many government interventions and regulations, giving it a much higher level of autonomy compared to other French universities and schools. The epithet Sciences Po is applied to both entities, which inherited the reputation previously vested in ELSP.

The public-private nature of Sciences Po, Paris, also distinguishes it from a network of institutes of political studies throughout the country that were inspired by its curriculum, namely in Strasbourg, Lyon, Aix, Bordeaux, Grenoble, Toulouse, Rennes and Lille. They are not to be confused with the seven campuses of Sciences Po in France.

The government also established in 1945 the École Nationale d'Administration (ENA), an elite postgraduate school for training government officials. From then on, the Grands Corps de l'Etat were obliged to recruit new entrants from ENA. Sciences Po became the school of choice for those hoping to enter the ENA, and so retained its dominant place in educating high-ranking officials.

1945 to the 1990s 
Between 1952 and 1969, 77.5% of the ENA's graduate student intake were Sciences Po alumni.

FNSP received a significant donations from the Rockefeller Foundation. FNSP published periodicals such as la Revue française de science politique, le Bulletin analytique de documentation, la Chronologie politique africaine, and the Cahiers de la Fondation as well as its seven research centres and main publishing house, Presses de Sciences Po.

1990s to the 2020s: The new Sciences Po 

Sciences Po was substantially reformed from the mid-1990s so as to diversify its focus beyond political science and beyond France, mainly under the influence of Olivier Duhamel, who formally had different roles during until his resignation in 2021. Sciences Po was also hit by a number of crises and controversies during this period.

1990s to 2012: Diversification and internationalization 

After the directorship of Alain Lancelot (1987-1997), the latter choose Olivier Duhamel to sponsor the candidacy of Richard Descoings, who became the director of Sciences Po with Duhamel as special advisor.

Under the directorship of Richard Descoings (1997–2012), the school incorporated courses in various branches of the social sciences on top of political science, such as law, economics, history, and sociology. In addition, the school began requiring all its undergraduate students to spend a year abroad, and introduced a multilingual curriculum in French, English, and other languages. Sciences Po also began to expand outside Paris, establishing regional campuses throughout France.

During this period, Sciences Po also implemented reforms in its admissions process. Previously, Sciences Po recruited its students exclusively on the basis of a competitive examination. This system was seen to favor students from prestigious preparatory high schools, largely attended by the children of the French political elite. In 2001, Sciences Po founded the Equal Opportunity Program, widening its admissions policy. This program enables the institution to recruit high-potential students at partner high schools in more disadvantaged parts of France who, due to a social, academic, and financial constraints, would not otherwise have been able to attend Sciences Po.

From 2001 to 2011, the proportion of scholarship students at Sciences Po went from 6 to 27 percent with around 30% of all students at Sciences Po currently receiving some form of scholarship.

The reforms Descoings spearheaded were at times controversial, however, and his leadership style came under heavy criticism for "reigning as almighty king" and to implement a "management of fear". A further report by the French Court of Audit in 2012 severely criticized Sciences Po under the Descoings leadership for its opaque, and possibly illegal, financial management, notably with regard to management salaries, in particular to himself.

2013 to 2021: Expansion 

After the sudden death of Richard Descoing, Frédéric Mion, a graduate of Sciences Po, ENA and École Normale Supérieure and former secretary general of Canal+, was appointed director of Sciences Po on 1 March 2013. It was criticized as a choice of Olivier Duhamel, even though the two other candidates were said to have a much stronger applications than the 9 pages given by Mion in his last minute candidacy with the sponsorship of Duhamel. Louis Vogel, former front-runner candidate who retracted his candidacy to protest against the governance process in Sciences Po, stated that an institution that want to have a place in the academic national and international environment cannot achieve such a thing without having an academic ("universitaire", a researcher and lecturer coming from the universités as opposed to the grandes écoles) at its head.

Mion's intention to pursue Sciences Po's development as a "selective university of international standing" is detailed in the policy paper "Sciences Po 2022", published in the spring of 2014. The restructuring of Master's study into graduate schools continued with the creation of the School of Public Affairs and the Urban School in 2015 and the School of Management and Innovation in 2016.

In early 2016, Sciences Po updated its governance structure, adopting new statutes for its two constituent bodies: the Fondation nationale des sciences politiques (FNSP) and the Institut d'études politiques de Paris (IEP).

In late 2016, Sciences Po acquired a new site, the Hôtel de l'Artillerie in the 7th arrondissement of Paris, which it intends to make it a site of "educational renewal".

In April 2018, Sciences Po students blocked the main entrance to the school in protest against Macron's education reforms which gives universités the power to set admission criteria and rank applicants (a power that Sciences Po has).

Since 2021: Crisis of reputation and governance 

In 2021, Sciences Po was hit by the Duhamel scandal, mainly put forward by the best-seller book La Familia Grande and newspaper articles from Le Monde and Nouvel Obs, a sexual violence scandal one and a succession crisis. Olivier Duhamel, director of the National Foundation of Sciences Po, Frédéric Mion, director of Sciences Po, and other members of the board of these institutions resigned. It led to appeals to a reform of the governance of Sciences Po. Instead, Sciences Po faced "ultimate attempts of a generation to maintain control of the designation of a successor for Duhamel". This process further tarnished the reputation of Sciences Po. L'Express later published a significant investigation on the transformations of Sciences Po since the 1990s, called "Sciences Po goes off the rails".

Bénédicte Durand, interim administrator of Sciences Po, published in L’Express an op-ed stating that Sciences Po is facing "one of the most painful crisis of (the) history" of Sciences Po. She criticized the fact that the school has become the "target" of a "witch hunt" and is held responsible for "all the woes of the society" without "intellectual honesty", and told "hate-mongers" that Sciences Po will survive this crisis in spite of the "threats". The institute later published reports on deontology and sexual violence that were called by Nouvel Obs "abundant but shy".

On 22 November 2021 Mathias Vicherat, former CEO of Danone, former spokesman of the French National Railways Network and former deputy cabinet director of the Mayor in Paris, assumed office as the new director of Sciences Po. This appointment has been criticized, because Vicherat does not have an academic background and would have been chosen as the former classmate and friend of the president. Vicherat pledged to name someone with an academic experience as number 2 to compensate his background. He wants to reinforce the private sector outcomes of the Sciences Po diploma.

In 2022, the book "Une jeunesse engagée" was published, describing the evolution of Sciences Po student body over the decades. In 2022, 70% of the students considered themeselves as part of an elite, whereas only 53% did in 2002. 55% of the students voted for left-wing politician Jean-Luc Mélenchon and 71% of the students consider themselves as left-wing, whereas 57% did in 2002. The book also described a place where knowledge and study have little place and where students focus on networking and the dismay of students and lecturers in front of this new reality.

Further controversies occurred, including one around the cancellation of two lectures by Peggy Sastre and Leonardo Orlando around the theory of evolution of Charles Darwin and gender studies., with the direct involvement of Vicherat.

Campuses
Sciences Po has seven campuses in France, with each specialising in different regions of the globe. Every May, at the end of the academic year, all seven campuses come together for the inter-campus Collegiades de SciencesPo tournament, also known as the MiniCrit. At the tournament, students represent each campus and compete against one another in arts and athletic competitions. Different events include athletic games such as volleyball and football, as well as artistic competitions such as music and dance.

Paris campus

The Paris campus is spread across several buildings concentrated around the Boulevard Saint-Germain in the 6th and 7th arrondissements. The historic centre of Sciences Po at 27 rue Saint-Guillaume houses the head office and central library since 1879. It is also home to Sciences Po's two largest teaching halls, the Amphitheatres Émile Boutmy and Jacques Chapsal. Other buildings include:

 117, boulevard Saint-Germain: School of Journalism
 199, boulevard Saint-Germain: Doctoral School
 174 and 224, boulevard Saint-Germain: offices and classrooms
 13, rue de l'Université / The René Rémond building: Law School and administrative offices
 8, rue Jean-Sébastien-Bach: Urban School
 28, rue des Saints-Pères: Paris School of International Affairs (PSIA)
 56, rue des Saints-Pères: Language Lab, audiovisual service and a cartography workshop.
 56, rue Jacob: Research Center for History (Centre d'histoire de Sciences Po) and International Relations (Centre d'études et de recherches internationales)

The Paris campus enrolls about 3,000 undergraduate students, almost a third of whom are international exchange students.

Sciences Po purchased in 2016 the Hôtel de l’Artillerie, a 17th-century former monastery of 14,000 m2 located 200 meters from its campus on rue Saint-Guillaume, from the French Ministry of Defense and refurbished the building for a total cost of around 200 million euros in total (estimation). The new facility which opened in 2022, hosts 7 graduate schools including School of Public Affairs, Paris School of International Affairs, Law School, Urban School, School of Management and Impact, School of Journalism and the School of Research. Furthermore, the new Saint Thomas campus is home to the scientific department and the institute of innovation as well as the Sciences Po's Center for Entrepreneurship. It will provide social housing for 50 to 100 students with need-based aid from the State.

Dijon campus 
Located in the region of Burgundy in a 19th-century building, the Dijon campus was created in 2001.

Le Havre campus 
Located on the coast of Normandy, Le Havre has hosted the undergraduate Euro-Asian campus since 2007. The campus has 3 majors, including economics and society, politics and government and political humanities, students primarily choose to spend their third year abroad in an Asian country. Furthermore, Le Havre is home to several Dual Degree programs, and welcomes international students from over thirty countries from all around the world.

Menton campus 
Established in the French Riviera city of Menton in 2005, the campus is located in an entirely renovated 19th-century building overlooking the Mediterranean. According to the Sciences Po brochure, Menton is home to the Middle Eastern and Mediterranean focus branch of Sciences Po and welcomes 300 students each year. Students study in one of two tracks (anglophone/francophone) and may take one of three core Oriental languages (Arabic, Farsi, or Turkish) and an additional concentration language (Italian or Hebrew) if they are fluent in their core language. The third mandatory year abroad is spent in the Middle East or elsewhere.

Nancy campus 
Established in the region of Lorraine in 2000, the Nancy campus is located in an 18th century heritage site, the Hôtel des Missions Royales. The curriculum is taught in French, English and German, as it focuses on the European Union and French-German relations.

Poitiers campus 
Opened in 2010, the campus is located in the heart of the historic city of Poitiers in the Hôtel Chaboureau, a renovated building dating from the 15th century. The academic programme is focused on Latin America and the Iberian Peninsula.

Reims campus 
The Reims campus opened in September 2010.  It is housed in the 17th century College des Jesuits. Despite being the most recent campus, it is the largest of the regional campuses of Sciences Po, with over 1,600 undergraduate.

Organisation

Governance 
Sciences Po operates under a dual governance model composed of two entities: the Fondation nationale des sciences politiques (FNSP), a private non-profit foundation, and the Institut d’études politiques de Paris or Paris Institute of Political Studies, a public higher education institution. These two bodies constitute Sciences Po, which is the official term used to designate them collectively.

The FNSP is responsible for the strategic direction and administrative and financial management of Sciences Po. It is administered by a board of directors.

The role of the Paris Institute of Political Studies is to ensure teaching, research and library services, like all international research universities. Its governing bodies consist of the Board of Directors, the Student Life and Education Committee and the Academic Board.

The Executive Committee is the institution’s operational steering committee. It brings together the directors of Sciences Po’s various divisions and offices under the authority of the President of Sciences Po. The Executive Committee implements the strategic direction and makes operational decisions on running and managing the institution.

Finances 
Sciences Po's resources have grown threefold over the past 15 years, from €55 million in 2000 to €128 million in 2010 to €197 million in 2018. 

The French government’s support for the institution, in the form of structural public subsidies, has increased from €36 million in 2000 to €69.3 million in 2018. At the same time, growth in the institution's own resources has led to a gradual decline in the relative share of public funds in Sciences Po's overall budget. This figure has decreased by more than one-third, from 66% in 2000 to approximately 35% in 2018.

Sciences Po's own resources have grown significantly. They have been multiplied by six: from €18.3 million in 2000 to €127.2 million in 2018. These resources now account for a majority of the budget.

The institution took on a debt of €191 million in 2016 in order to fund the acquisition of its new Paris campus and undertake the restoration of the site. This debt is partially guaranteed by the Paris City Council.

Education

The academic bodies of Sciences Po consist of the Undergraduate College, six professional schools, and the Doctoral School.

Undergraduate level 
The Sciences Po Undergraduate College offers a three-year Bachelor of Arts degree with a multidisciplinary foundation in the humanities and social sciences with emphasis on civic, linguistic, artistic, and digital training.

On all campuses, students choose a multidisciplinary major – Politics & Government, Economies & Societies, or Political Humanities. In addition, each campus offers a different regional specialism which anchors students' intellectual objectives, the regions are: Africa, Asia, Europe, Latin America, Middle East-Mediterranean, and North America.

Sciences Po offers dual bachelor's degrees with Columbia University, Keio University, University College London, Freie Universität Berlin, University of British Columbia, the University of Sydney, the National University of Singapore, the University of Hong Kong, and the University of California at Berkeley.

The current dean of the Undergraduate College is Stéphanie Balme.

In 2021, 15,284 students applied to the Undergraduate College across all three admissions pathways (the exam procedure, the Equal Opportunity Programme, and the international procedure). 1,630 students were accepted, for an admission rate of 7%.

Graduate level 
At the graduate level, Sciences Po's seven schools offer one- and two-year Master's programmes and PhD programmes. All graduate programmes are delivered on the Sciences Po campus in Paris. Sciences Po also hosts dual Master's programmes with international partners. Students enrolled in these dual degree programmes spend one year at Sciences Po in Paris and one year at the partner university.

Schools
The Undergraduate College (Collège universitaire) is the home of all undergraduate students. At the graduate level, there are seven professional schools:

 School of Public Affairs
 Paris School of International Affairs
 Sciences Po Law School
 Urban School
 School of Management and Innovation
 School of Journalism
 Doctoral School

The Doctoral School offers Master and PhD programmes in law, economics, history, political science, or sociology. The PhD programme contains roughly 600 doctoral candidates.

Research

Research at Sciences Po covers economics, law, history, sociology and political science, while also taking in interdisciplinary topics such as cities, political ecology, sustainable development, socio-economics and globalization.

Sciences Po is home to a research community that includes over 200 researchers and 350 PhD candidates. In 2015, 32% of the school's budget was devoted to research. That year, 65% of its research publications were in French, 32% in English and 3% in other languages.

The institute has research centers, seven of which are affiliated with France's National Centre for Scientific Research (CNRS).

 Center for Socio-Political Data (CDSP), which provides scientifically validated data for international survey programs. It also supports training in data collection and analysis.
 Centre for European Studies and Comparative Politics (CEE), which focuses on inter-disciplinary European studies; participation, democracy and government; election analyses; the restructuring of the state and public action.
 Centre for International Studies (CERI), which produces comparative and historical analysis on foreign societies, international relations, and political, social and economic phenomena.
 Centre for Political Research (CEVIPOF), which investigates political attitudes, behaviour and parties, as well as political thought and the history of ideas.
 Centre for History (CHSP), whose research focuses on: arts, knowledge and culture; wars, conflicts and violence; states, institutions and societies; the political and cultural history of contemporary France; from local to global; international history and its levels.
 Centre for the Sociology of Organisations (CSO), which conducts research on the sociology of organisations, sociology of public policy, and economic sociology. It also studies issues related to higher education and research, healthcare, sustainable development, the evolution of firms, and the transformation of the state.
 Center for Studies in Social Change (OSC), which conducts research on topics such as urban, school and gender inequalities, stratification and social mobility, and ethno-racial or social segregation.
 Department of Economics, which investigates areas such as labour markets, international economics, political economy, microeconomics and development.
 Law School, whose research focuses on globalisation, legal cultures and the economics of law. It has also produced work on the theory and history of law, public and private international law and intellectual property.
 Médialab, which studies the way data generated by new information technologies is produced, circulated and exploited.
 The French Economic Observatory (OFCE), which is both a research centre and an independent economic forecasting body. Its stated mission is to "ensure that the fruits of scientific rigour and academic independence serve the public debate about the economy".

In addition to these research units, the institute has recently established three major research programs – the LIEPP, DIME-SHS and MaxPo.

The Laboratoire Interdisciplinaire d'Evaluation des Politiques Publiques (LIEPP) analyzes public policy based on qualitative, comparative, and quantitative methods. The laboratory has been selected by an international scientific jury as a "Laboratoire d'Excellence" (Labex) that will be financed for the next ten years by the French government.
Données Infrastructures et Méthodes d'Enquête en Sciences Humaines et Sociales (DIME-SHS) aims to collect and disseminate data for use in humanities and social sciences research.
The Max Planck Sciences Po Center on Coping with Instability in Market Societies (known as MaxPo), was founded in 2012 in co-operation with the Max Planck Institute for the Study of Societies (MPIfG). It investigates how individuals, organizations, and nation-states deal with various forms of economic and social instability. It is located at Sciences Po's Paris campus.

Library and publishing

Founded in 1871, the nucleus of the school's research is the Bibliothèque de Sciences Po. The library offers a collection of more than 950,000 titles in the field of social sciences.

In 1982, the Ministry of National Education made the Bibliothèque the Centre for Acquisition and Dissemination of Scientific and Technical Information in the field of political science, and since 1994, it has been the antenna associated with the Bibliothèque Nationale de France. The Bibliothèque de Sciences Po is also the main French partner in the International Bibliography of the Social Sciences, which is based at the London School of Economics.

Founded in the 1950s, Presses de Sciences Po is the publishing house of Sciences Po. It publishes academic works related to the social sciences.

Public lectures
Sciences Po organizes public lecture events. Recent guest speakers have included Ban Ki-moon, General David Petraeus, Condoleezza Rice, former President of Brazil Luiz Inácio Lula da Silva, Eric Schmidt, Joseph Stiglitz, Sheryl Sandberg, Mario Draghi, UNESCO Director-General Irina Bokova and Harvard University professor Michael Sandel.

Since 2007 it has organized the Franco-British Dialogue Lecture Series in collaboration with the LSE and the French Embassy in London. The lectures are held every term at the LSE's European Institute.

Reputation and rankings

Rankings

In rankings based on English-speaking publications, in 2022, Sciences Po ranks 2nd globally for the study of Politics in the QS World University Subjects Rankings, whereas it is ranked 62nd in social sciences by Times Higher Education. In QS Rankings and Times Higher Education, Sciences Po is globally ranked 242 and 401–500.

Reputation and criticism
Sciences Po is often described by others and itself as an elite institution, due to its admissions selectivity and its close connection with powerful networks within French society. It has been described as a "school of power" that has emulated abroad. Because this elite status is associated with social reproduction, Sciences Po launched an "Equal Opportunity Programme" in 2001, to increase the representation of working class families, which as of 2013, make up 9% of students.

Sciences Po has been described as a school prioritising professional networks over expertise. It diversification beyond political science and history in the 1990s would have resulted in limited expertise on each subject. As a result, the school is nicknamed "Sciences Pipeau" (pronounced and sometimes spelled "Sciences Pipo", "pipeau" meaning "scam" in colloquial French) by the general public and within the school. One of the courses related to the Law have been nicknamed "Legal Bullshit" by students due to the lack of content.

The school has therefore been criticized by outside observers and students for not having them acquire an actual expertise. The sociologist Nicolas Jounin, alumnus of Sciences Po, talked about an "intellectual imposture" in an op-ed called "it is time to be done with Sciences Po". The journalist at France Culture Guillaume Erner stated that the institution is "only advertisement and artifice". According "Le Monde", students in the school would be sometimes "disillusioned" after having "fantasized" about the school.

The institute has been described as having low expectations from its students. According to Le Monde, "when students educated in a faculty of social science join a master at Sciences Po, their academic level is often higher than those who followed multi-disciplinary education at an institute of political science". The Law courses at Sciences Po have also received criticism for holding lower standards than those at full law degrees; a student both at Sciences Po and at Paris II told L'Express: "In Law (at Paris II), I spend three days on an essay and I have 8 (out of 20); at Sciences Po, I spend three hours on an essay and I have 16 (out of 20)." In 2012, lecturers at Sciences Po criticized instructions they received from the school telling them not to take into account grammar mistakes in their marking. The trend would furthermore be a decline of the level; according to Le Monde, the cause would be the 2001 "Equal Opportunity Programme", but a lecturer in the school stated in 2021 that the reason is more the desire to attract international students and therefore the need to mark more leniently: all marks are harmonized so that the average mark would always be the same.

The school has also been criticized for its close-mindedness and for its self-persuasion to be an elite institution. Libération stated in an editorial that the school have not understood that it is not special in the outside world. Peter Gumbel called Sciences Po and other "Grandes Écoles" "elite colleges [which] have become a machine for perpetuating a brilliant but blinkered, often arrogant and frequently incompetent ruling freemasonry".  The academic Gilles Devers criticized the institution for being the "base of the conservatism, and the mold of the molluscs that make the public elite" where "dissenting ideas are only admitted if they strengthen the system".

Sciences Po has also been accused of being unduly helped by the media and politicians. "Almost every French newspaper is run by an alumnus of Sciences Po", and most of the journalists in France are alumni from Sciences Po, so it would give the school "an unparalleled media coverage" and permit it to "cultivate a culture of secrecy" about its internal affairs. "Sciences-Po is under-criticized," analyzes a professor for Mediapart, "Those who teach there have no interest, and not necessarily the urge, to do so. Those who are not there can hope to be there one day." The journalist Ariane Chemin stated in 2013 that, because so many journalists come from Sciences Po, the school has an unduly good public reputation.

The institute has also been criticized for the unfair favoritism it would be the subject of from the State, in which many public servants would be alumni of the school. It is partly state-funded, and some, including institutes of political studies in the provinces, have indeed accused it of receiving a disproportionate share of public money. In 2012, for example, Sciences Po Lille student representatives called Sciences Po (Paris) the "coronation of State inequity". Nicolas Jounin stated that the school is a "financial hold-up".

Controversies

Governance 

Sciences Po is funded in large part by public money and is a semi-public institute but is governed as a private institution. It has been described by Alain Garigou as governed from 1872 to 2013 in compliance the "discreet rules of the bourgeoisie". The founder Emile Boutmy stayed the director until his death in 1906 and his successor stayed until he was 90 years old in 1936.

In 2013, the process of designation of a successor for Richard Descoings has been openly criticized. Louis Vogel, professor of law, former president of the Society of Presidents of university, of Paris 2 University and of Sorbonne University and Sciences Po alumnus, had announced its candidacy based on bringing the school closer to the universités in a new international environment. He was presented as the front-runner as his profile and experience matched the best the advertised job profile. Louis Vogel was one of the three preselected candidacies but ended up retracting its candidacy before the final choice. He stated that the pre-selection also chose candidates who did not fit with the job profile, showed that the real desired profile was else, and that he did not want to endorse with his candidacy a process that is in opposition with his convictions. He further stated that Sciences Po "is sending a bad signal" and that they will have to solve their issue internally. The student vice-president of the executive board said that this decision is a "disavowal" for the research committee of Sciences Po. Two other candidates publicly criticized the process. In the end, Frédéric Mion made a last minute candidacy with a light application of 9 pages and was chosen with the sponsorship of Olivier Duhamel.

In 2021, after the Duhamel scandal, and the resignations of Olivier Duhamel and Frédéric Mion, the process for the designation of the new head of the National Foundation, a new board of the Foundation and a new head the institute (Sciences Po itself) was heated and largely criticized. The press talked about a "bad soap" filled with "low blows", and alumni and academics talked about a "grotesque" "parody of democracy" According to Challenges, people close to Duhamel who are still members of the board of the National Foundation and who will be leaving are creating ad hoc committees, outside of the status of the Foundation, to process to votes in which they have a preponderant voice to choose in advance who can be candidate to become the head and the new members of the board, who will select afterwards the director of Sciences Po itself. After several votes which have been criticized for their lack of due process, Laurence Bertrand has been pre-selected to become the new head of the Foundation. Another candidate judged the legitimity of the process "hardly credible". A third candidate published an op-ed in Le Monde exposing the details of what he called a "tragicomedy". In the end, Mathias Vicherat, former CEO of Danone, was chosen. This appointment has been criticized, because Vicherat does not have an academic background. He would have been chosen as a friend and former classmate of Emmanuel Macron. A lecturer at the Institute said: "The whole procedure was shamelessly rigged so that in the end, only the candidacy of Mathias Vicherat, the President's friend, with no academic experience, remained. They methodically discarded all serious candidates."

Duhamel scandal 

Camille Kouchner, daughter of Bernard Kouchner, published a book in which she wrote that her step-father Olivier Duhamel, at that time president of the Foundation of Sciences Po which was the "heart of [his] power" for 30 years, sexually abused his step-son for two years during his childhood. She denounced the "microcosm of powerful people, [at] Saint-Germain-des-Prés" (headquarters of Sciences Po) who "knew" according to her, but acted "like nothing happened". Newspapers further unearthed a series of controversial attitudes toward the sexuality of minors. It led to a series of investigations on the environment of Duhamel at Sciences Po and on the way they dealt with these abuses.

The scandal "shook" Sciences Po (Le Monde) and put it into turmoil (France Culture). The scandal was compared to a "bomb" launched on Sciences Po (Le Figaro), to an "unpinned grenade throwned on Sciences Po" (Le Temps and Courrier International) and to a "shockwave" on Sciences Po (The Times, La Croix etc.). Frederic Mion had been alerted, in particular by Aurélie Filippetti in 2019, former Ministry of Culture, of the situation but a "law of silence" had been put in place in the family regarding this. Mion declared he thought he was  "rumour" and that he should have taken the issue more seriously. He told Le Monde: "I let myself be fooled". According to Le Temps, a group of lecturers knew these allegations, some of them since 2008. They didn't break the silence, justifying themselves by the possible prescriptive period or that these facts were part of the "familial saga" in a hedonist context and "complex parents-children relations" in the 1970s.

The scandal eventually led to a series of resignations under pressure at Sciences Po. After Duhamel himself resigned, both students of Sciences Po and public figures asked for the resignation of Frédéric Mion, director of Sciences Po, who first refused to do so. Mion, who Duhamel hand-picked in controversial circumstances as director of Sciences Po with a salary of 200,000 euros, first acknowledged "errors in judgment in [his] handling of the allegations", and after a continuous pressure to do so, resigned in the end. It later became apparent that he had lied to the inspectors to protect at least 6 other people inside Sciences Po. Marc Guillaume, former secretary of state, current prefect of the Paris region, and a close associate of Duhamel, resigned from the National foundation of Sciences Po.

Through Sciences Po, Duhamel had a large "network of influence" in politics, newspapers, TV channels, finance, etc. and therefore the scandal attained many people because of their link with the institution. Their role in protecting this intellectual environment has been questioned. Duhamel's power has extented to Emmanuel Macron and Édouard Philippe (former prime minister), both Sciences Po alumni, and both are trying to distance themselves from the "Dumahel case". Elisabeth Guigou, former minister of Justice, resigned from the national commission on incest.

The scandal also has put into light the power of the Foundation of Sciences Po, less well known than Sciences Po itself but "at the heart of strategical decisions since 1945", and that the FNSP and Sciences Po are "untouchable with the power of their network".

Following the Duhamel scandal, Sciences Po issued a statement condemning "all forms of sexualized violence" and declaring "its shock and astonishment". It also stated: “The fight against sexual and gender-based violence is at the heart of our institution's core values and actions.”

Sexual violence 
After Richard Descoing, head of the school from 1997 to 2012, died under suspicious circumstances, it was revealed that he had sex with students, and made no case of Dominique Strauss-Kahn's habit of "seducing" young students. Descoing also has been accused of sending burning messages to students, but no further inquiry was made. Descoing had a controversial night life and relation to drugs, and was found dead in a hotel in suspicious circumstances. After the New York v. Strauss-Kahn case, DSK had to stop giving lectures at Sciences Po. He admitted orgies with young women but had denied any violence.

In February 2021, hundreds of students and former students shared on Twitter allegations of rape or sexual abuse at several Instituts d'études politiques, and claimed that despite denunciations of victims, "colleagues and staff [were] unwilling to take their complaints seriously". A hashtag #SciencesPorcs ("Sciences Pigs", similar to the French #Metoo hashtag #Balancetonporcs) has been widely used to do so.

Among many op-eds dealing with the 2021 crisis at Sciences Po, two male alumni published in L'Express an op-ed specific to the sexual violence scandal, stating their disagreement with the "caricature" that is made of Sciences Po, which would be the object of "passions, sometimes irrational ones" in the public "imaginary" because of the elite status they say the institute has; they assured there is no systemic problem regarding sexual violence in Sciences Po. Bénédicte Durand, interim administrator of the school, further told Le Figaro that "no, there is no rape culture in Sciences Po".

The school published a report on sexual and sexist violence that was called "abundant but shy".

Racism and social issues 

Students have created the associations "Alwanat" and "Being Black at Sciences Po" to denounce open anti-Arab, anti-Muslim, anti-Black and anti-Asian hate by staff and students in the Reims and Menton campuses. Students anonymously asked the institute to recognise the existence of racism in Sciences Po.

Many students and some members of the French Parliament have expressed concern about the enforcement of racialism in Sciences Po.

Sciences Po have been criticized in 2022 for "censuring" lectures on darwinism and theory of evolution, considered by some critics as the "ultimate taboo" in the institute. Vicherat, director of Sciences Po, insisted however that Darwin is not censured at Sciences Po.

The institution has been accused in 2021 by two members of Parliament, in particular Annie Genevard, to give additional points to students using the controversial écriture inclusive. Sciences Po has denied this claim and it has been widely reported as fake news, but Le Figaro news have found the information to be true and some media have taken back their assessment of this information as being fake news.

Financial scandals
Alain Lancelot, director of Sciences Po from 1987 to 1996, was investigated for financial mismanagement by the French Court of Audit.

Since 1997, the institution has been hit by a number of scandals, notably concerning the leadership of Richard Descoings, its director from 1997 to 2012.

Descoings, director from 1997 to 2012, had been criticized for offering large sums of money (through salary rise, free accommodation, etc.) to diverse members of staff, including his wife, in spite of the fact that Sciences Po is partly stately funded.

In February 2012, it was revealed that an inspector of the French Court of Audit, in charge of investigating the financial behaviour of Sciences Po, was at the same time employed by Sciences Po.

On 3 April 2012, Descoings was found dead in his Manhattan luxury hotel room during a trip where he was representing Sciences Po in New York. The police initially concluded that his death had been caused by an overdose, but the final coronary report eventually stated that he died a natural death. Descoings' energy on this last day and the missing phones and computer have raised questions as to the precise circumstances of his death.

In October 2012, the Court of Audit reprimanded Sciences Po for financial mismanagement, accusing it of opaque remuneration procedures, unwarranted expenses claims and excessive pay-rises for managers. The Court noted that the school's complex legal status – a public institute managed by a private trust – had contributed to dysfunction and waste. It also criticized the French government for increasing state funding for the school without insisting on additional public oversight. Sciences Po has also been accused to prevail results over morals.

In November 2012, the government dismissed , Sciences Po's interim director, but he sought the school's permanent directorship all the same, reasoning that Alain Lancelot and Richard Descoings, former Sciences Po directors, had also been reprimanded by the Court of Audit and yet performed well in their management of the school.

In July 2015, Jean-Claude Casanova, the former president of the Foundation Nationale des Sciences Politiques, the private trust which manages Sciences Po, was fined €1500 for failing to properly consult the Foundation's Administrative Council over budgeting decisions involving public money. The Court of Financial and Budgetary Discipline eventually found Casanova guilty, but gave him a lenient sentence because the procedures had some part of regularity and because it was not customary in Sciences Po to follow all the financial rules.

In February 2016, the Court of Audit noted that reforms had been made, but stated that greater transparency was still needed. Frédéric Mion, director of Sciences Po since 2013, defended the school's record and asked the judges to write their report again.

Access to the Bar 

Originally, only the "maîtrise en droit" delivered after 4 years of study by universités (as opposed to Grandes écoles like Sciences Po) was giving access to the legal profession. As soon as 2004, fearing for the access to the bar and legal professions to be open to institutions that are not faculties of law in universités, 54 professors of law signed a long text in the 'Recueil Dalloz' (major French legal journal), called "The Fight for the Law". They pointed out in particular the problem of the quality of the knowledge of legal professionals and of their deontology, should it be otherwise. They managed to have the education in law to have a special place in the French Code of Education. The move was co-led by Guillaume Drago, professor at Paris II Panthéon-Assas, and François Gaudu, professor at Paris 1 Pantheon-Sorbonne.

In 2007, however, a governmental decree authorized Sciences Po students to pass the Bar exam, providing they take a master's degree with the mention "law". Academics in law labeled such a move as a "coup" and created an online petition called "call against the questioning of the utility of legal studies in the education of lawyers" ("appel contre la remise en cause de l'utilité des études juridiques dans la formation des avocats"). 445 academics publicly signed the petition, which is 15% of all French academics in law. The unity of the French academic body was noted: left- and right-wing professors, professors from Paris and outside Paris, in public law or private law... were in favor of the move. Students’ unions supported it. The union of (French) law school's deans "totally" associated itself to the move too. These critics said that it would not be a problem if Sciences Po was offering 8 semesters of law, as required as a general rule, to access to the bar. However, Sciences Po would be offering only general courses in social sciences with only a "sprinkling of law" in the masters programs. That would not be enough to become a barrister (avocat) and would put into question the utility of the law to become one. It would be creating barristers with a cheap education in law and would be detrimental, in particular, for the citizens who would take the services of barristers who did not have a proper education in law. To them, with this decree, the law was becoming a marketing product in a service of a school of political science that has many connections with politicians. They would have preferred Sciences Po to keep with political sciences.

In 2009, Sciences Po created the "École de droit de Sciences Po" ("law school", as opposed in French to a faculté de droit, "faculty of law"), delivering masters (graduate) degrees only. In 2008, partly as an answer, Paris II Panthéon-Assas created a collège de droit (undergraduate level) and then an "école de droit" (graduate level) on top of its faculty of law to attract top students in France. A lot of universities followed this model, and created these highly selective "colleges" or "schools".

Use of adjunct lecturers 

Sciences Po has been criticized for the abuse of the title of "professor" from their adjunct lecturers. Only 7% of the teaching body have permanent employment. People lecturing only a few hours call themselves "professor at Sciences Po". This creates artificial advertisement, both for Sciences Po advertising a prestigious "staff" and for politicians and journalists linking themselves to this prestigious network.

Notable people

Alumni 

It has been customary to graduate in Sciences Po in addition to a law school or a grande école in Paris, therefore many of these graduates are also graduates of the latter. Most the alumni network is composed of students who received lectures in Sciences in addition to another studies.

In 2016, the Sciences Po Alumni Association declared that there were 55,000 alumni. Many alumni are notable for their roles in fields such as politics or business.

Politics 

Five of the eight presidents of the French Fifth Republic have attended Sciences Po, including Georges Pompidou (in addition to the École normale supérieure), François Mitterrand (in addition to the Paris Law Faculty), Jacques Chirac, Nicolas Sarkozy (who did not graduate; in addition to the law school of Paris Nanterre University), François Hollande (in addition to HEC and Paris II), and Emmanuel Macron. Acting president Alain Poher (in addition to Mines ParisTech) is also an alumnus. A number of French politicians who are Sciences Po alumni also graduated from Ecole Nationale d'Administration (ENA), as the Sciences Po degree and its preparatory programmes prepare well for the competitive entrance to ENA.

According to a study published in Le Monde in 2017, 14% (81 of the 577) of French members of parliament elected the same year were Sciences Po graduates, the most represented university in the National Assembly. The French Castex government included a number of Sciences Po graduates, including Florence Parly, Bruno Le Maire, and Jean-Michel Blanquer.

Some politicians having a role in international organisations were also students at Sciences Po, including Simone Veil, former President of the European Parliament; Boutros Boutros-Ghali, former UN Secretary General; Pascal Lamy, former Director-General of the World Trade Organisation; Michel Camdessus and Dominique Strauss-Kahn, former presidents of the International Monetary Fund; Jean-Claude Trichet, former President of the European Central Bank; and Marisol Touraine, Chair of Unitaid Executive Board.

Sciences Po is also alma mater to politicians including Władysław Grabski (Prime Minister of Poland 1920, 1923-1925), Habib Bourgiba (Prime Minister of the Kingdom of Tunisia 1956-1957 and the first President of the Tunisian Republic 1957-1987), Joseph Ki-Zerbo (Burkinabé advocate for African independence), Mohammad Mosaddegh (Prime Minister of Iran 1951-1953), Pierre Trudeau (Prime Minister of Canada 1968–1979, 1980–1984), and Thanat Khoman (Thai Minister of Foreign Affairs 1959-1971 and Deputy Prime Minister 1981-1983).

Diplomacy 

Senior French diplomats including Jean-Marcel Jeanneney (France's first Ambassador to Algieria) François Delattre (currently Permanent Representative of France to the UN), Gérard Araud (former ambassador to the USA), Sylvie Bermann (currently ambassador to Russia), Bernard Émié (currently Director of the DGSE), Jean-Maurice Ripert (former Permanent Representative of France to the United Nations, Ambassador of France to Russia, and Ambassador of France to China), and Maurice Gourdault-Montagne (currently ambassador to China) are also alumni.

Other 
The writer Marcel Proust for one year, the founder of the modern Olympics Pierre de Coubertin for one year, fashion designer Christian Dior, author Leïla Slimani, author Emmanuel Carrère, Harvard University Professor of political science Stanley Hoffmann, Chinese linguist Ma Jianzhong, Director of Paris Peace Forum Justin Vaïsse, journalist Arthur Dreyfus, researcher, Margaret Maruani, political scientist Tiago C. Peixoto, and former Le Monde editor Jean-Marie Colombani have all graduated from Sciences Po.

Permanent staff 

Jurist and 1907 Nobel Peace Prize laureate Louis Renault taught international law at Sciences Po since its foundation in 1875 until his death in 1918.

Economist Jean-Paul Fitoussi taught at Sciences Po since 1982.

Élie Halévy taught history of English political ideas and socialism at Sciences Po from 1896 until his death in 1937.

Pierre Renouvin, a French historian of international relations, taught at Sciences Po from 1938 to 1970

Arbitrator Emmanuel Gaillard taught at the Law School until his death.

The philosopher, anthropologist and sociologist Bruno Latour taught at Sciences Po from 2006 until his death in 2022.

Pierre Hassner, a Romanian-French geopolitologist and philosopher, was Director Emeritus of Research at the Sciences Po Center for International Studies and Research.

Jean-Luc Parodi, a French political scientist, worked at the Sciences Po Center of Political Research for the entirety of his career.

Directors

National foundation of Sciences Po (FNSP) 

 ...-2021 : Olivier Duhamel
2021-... : Louis Schweitzer (interim)

Sciences Po 

 1872-1906 : Emile Boutmy
 1906-1936 : Eugène d'Eichtal
 1945–47 : Roger Seydoux
 1947–79 : Jacques Chapsal
 1979–87 : Michel Gentot
 1987–96: Alain Lancelot
 1997–2012: Richard Descoings
 2012: Hervé Crès (interim)
 2012–13: Jean Gaeremynck (interim)
 2013–2021: Frédéric Mion
 2021–2021 Bénédicte Durand (interim)
 2021–present Mathias Vicherat

See also

 Association of Professional Schools of International Affairs
 École nationale d'administration
 Grandes écoles
 Grands établissements
 Instituts d'études politiques
 List of Sciences Po honorary doctorate laureates
 Paris School of International Affairs

References and notes

Notes

Bibliography
 Richard Descoings, Sciences Po. De la Courneuve à Shanghai, préface de René Rémond, Paris: Presses de Sciences Po, 2007
 Jacques Chapsal, " L'Institut d'études politiques de l'Université de Paris ", Annales de l'Université de Paris, n° 1, 1950
 " Centenaire de l'Institut d'études politiques de Paris (1872–1972) ", brochure de l'Institut d'études politiques de Paris, 1972
 A Sciences-Po, les voyages forment la jeunesse, Monde Diplomatique, Février 2006
 Pierre Favre, Cent dix années de cours à l'École libre des sciences politiques et à l'Institut d'études politiques de Paris (1871–1982), thèse de doctorat, 2 volumes, 1986
 Gérard Vincent, Sciences Po. Histoire d'une réussite, Orban, Paris, 1987
 Marie-Estelle Leroty, L'Enseignement de l'histoire à l'École libre des sciences politiques et à l'Institut d'études politiques de l'Université de Paris de 1943 à 1968, mémoire de diplôme d'études approfondies dirigé par Jean-François Sirinelli, Institut d'études politiques de Paris, 2000
 Anne Muxel (direction), Les Étudiants de Sciences Po, Paris: Presses de Sciences Po, 2004, : Résultats d'une grande enquête menée en janvier 2002 auprès des élèves par le Cevipof
 Comité national d'évaluation des établissements publics à caractère scientifique, culturel et professionnel, Rapport d'évaluation de l'Institut d'études politiques de Paris, Septembre 2005
 Cyril Delhay, Promotion ZEP. Des quartiers à Sciences Po, Paris: Hachette, 2006,

External links

 Sciences Po (FNSP and IEP Paris) official English-version website
 Histoire@Politique (journal published by the IEP-Paris)
 In France, a Bastion of Privilege No More New York Times, September 2011

 
Instituts d'études politiques
Schools in Paris
Grandes écoles
Libraries in Paris
Political science organizations
Schools of international relations
Educational institutions established in 1872
1872 establishments in France
Buildings and structures in the 7th arrondissement of Paris